Willow Township may refer to:

Arkansas
 Willow Township, Dallas County, Arkansas, in Dallas County, Arkansas

Iowa
 Willow Township, Cherokee County, Iowa
 Willow Township, Crawford County, Iowa
 Willow Township, Greene County, Iowa
 Willow Township, Monona County, Iowa
 Willow Township, Woodbury County, Iowa

Nebraska
 Willow Township, Antelope County, Nebraska

North Dakota
 Willow Township, Griggs County, North Dakota, in Griggs County, North Dakota

Oklahoma
 Willow Township, Caddo County, Oklahoma
 Willow Township, Greer County, Oklahoma

Wisconsin

 Willow, Wisconsin

See also

Willow (disambiguation)

Township name disambiguation pages